Vodafone Ukraine (formerly MTS Ukraine, prior to that: Ukrainian Mobile Communications, UMC) is the second-largest mobile operator in Ukraine with 23.1 million users and thus a 38 percent market share (in September 2014). In November 2009 it had 17.74 million GSM subscribers. The company is fully owned by NEQSOL Holding. In October 2015 Mobile TeleSystems and Vodafone expanded their 2008 strategic partnership; this resulted in the rebranding of MTS Ukraine to Vodafone Ukraine.

The company's main competitors are Kyivstar and Lifecell.

Vodafone's network codes in Ukraine are +380 50, +380 66, +380 95, and +380 99 (postpay and prepaid users mixed within the codes).

History
The company UMC Ukraine introduced mobile (cellular) services in Ukraine, initially using the analog NMT standard, then using GSM 900 and 1800. In 1993 UMC Ukraine was Ukraine's major cellular operator. In 2003 Mobile TeleSystems bought the company. In October 2006, MTS-Ukraine terminated its NMT service with plans to use the spectrum for the CDMA-450 rollout. From late 2006, MTS-Ukraine has developed its 3G mobile network with the CDMA-450 1xEV-DO standard.  the Ukrainian MTS network supports various value-added services based on GPRS / EGPRS / EDGE and SMS / WAP / MMS / USSD. MTS is the only BlackBerry service-provider in Ukraine; it also provides WiFi hotspots, mainly in large cities and at airports.

A survey of 500 companies by GfK Ukraine Company and the magazine "Correspondent" rated MTS-Ukraine as one of the three best employers in the country.
 
In 2007 MTS-Ukraine joined the United Nations Global Compact to acknowledge the obligations of the business sector with regard to universally accepted principles in the areas of human rights, labour, environment and anti-corruption. The company always gives great attention to advancing principles of social responsibility and to the 10 principles of The United Nations Global Compact. Corporate social responsibility is one of the major strategic priorities of MTS-Ukraine activity. MTS-Ukraine activity is constructed on social responsibility with respect to the state, consumers, employees, partners, competitors and Ukrainian society in general.
 
On March 15, 2007, MTS-Ukraine became the first telecommunication company in Ukraine to receive the Certificate of European Foundation for Quality Management (EFQM) "Perfection Recognition", which confirms the high standards of communication-operator work.

In 2007 MTS-Ukraine was acknowledged as the most known socially responsible company in Ukraine according to popular opinion and by independent research by the UMG Company. 
 
In 2008, research by the independent PRP Group Company rated MTS-Ukraine as the best in Ukraine as regards participation in the telecommunication market.

In 2008, and MTS-Ukraine's owner Mobile TeleSystems and Vodafone signed a strategic partnership.

In 2011 MTS-Ukraine openly declared its interest in acquiring Utel, a subsidiary of Ukrtelecom, Ukraine's monopolist telephone company, after Ukrtelecom announced plans to divest its mobile business. Vasyl Latsanych was appointed as company general director this year.

In October 2015 Mobile TeleSystems and Vodafone expanded their strategic partnership; this resulted in the rebranding of MTS Ukraine as "Vodafone Ukraine".

On 11 and 12 January 2018, the company operations in Ukraine's separatist entities on the occupied territories of Luhansk Oblast (on 11 January) and Donetsk Oblast (on 12 January) were discontinued after a fibre optic line cut. This resulted in two million people losing mobile phone access. Until the Vodafone Ukraine line was repaired the remaining mobile phone carriers available in the region were the two operated by the separatist authorities. On 19 January the repair of the  fibre optic line was completed and Vodafone Ukraine's services in territory controlled by the Luhansk People's Republic completely resumed. However, the territory controlled by the Donetsk People's Republic remained without a mobile connection; "the network does not work for reasons unknown to us" according to Vodafone Ukraine. On 23 March 2018, "Donetsk People's Republic" stated that Vodafone Ukraine could only resume operating in the territory controlled by it if it would start to pay taxes to the unrecognised state. Something Vodafone Ukraine refused.

Mobile TeleSystems sold its Ukraine operations in 2019. NEQSOL Holding acquired 100% of Vodafone Ukraine shares in December 2019. NEQSOL Holding is an Azerbaijani Holding founded in the 1990s.

War in Ukraine 
Since the beginning of the war in Ukraine on February 24, 2022, Vodafone Ukraine has been committed to helping civilians victims of the security situation on the ground. The company has been providing free national roaming in order to allow soldiers as well as civilians to remain connected, even in damaged areas.

References

External links
 

Mobile phone companies of Ukraine
Vodafone
MTS (network provider)
Telecommunications
Telecommunications companies